The adenomatoid odontogenic tumor is an odontogenic tumor arising from the enamel organ or dental lamina.

Signs and symptoms
Two thirds of cases are located in the anterior maxilla, and one third are present in the anterior mandible.

Two thirds of the cases are associated with an impacted tooth (usually being the canine).

Diagnosis
On radiographs, the adenomatoid odontogenic tumor presents as a radiolucency (dark area) around an unerupted tooth extending past the cementoenamel junction.

It should be differentially diagnosed from a dentigerous cyst and the main difference is that the radiolucency in case of AOT extends apically beyond the cementoenamel junction.

Radiographs will exhibit faint flecks of radiopacities surrounded by a radiolucent zone.

It is sometimes misdiagnosed as a cyst.

Treatment
Treatment can involve enucleation.

Epidemiology
It is fairly uncommon, but it is seen more in young people. Two thirds of the cases are found in females.

References

External links 

Odontogenic tumors